Rathnayake Arachchilage Somapala (Sinhala:සෝමපාල රත්නායක; 7 November 1947 – 18 July 2017), popularly known as Somapala Rathnayake, was a Sri Lankan actor, composer, lyricist and a renowned musician.

Personal life 
Rathnayake was born on 7 November 1947 in a small village near Kadugannawa as the fourth of the family with 10 siblings. His father was Rathnayake Arachchilage Don James. He was popularly known as Rathnayake Veda Mahaththaya, was an apothecary and sang "noorthi gee," a type of Sinhala folk songs. His mother was Abeykoon Mayadunnelage Sumanawathi. He was educated at Kadugannawa Junior School and then attended to Kadugannawa Maha Vidyalaya for secondary education. He learned music under K.M. Sugathapala at the school.

One of his elder brothers, Victor Rathnayake is a renowned musician in Sri Lanka. Victor has two daughters and two sons from first marriage with Chithra Rathnayake. His daughter Chandani is a dancer and a vocalist. His elder son Jayantha Rathnayake was a renowned musician and composer. Jayantha started his music career as the keyboard player in Sihashakthi musical band. Jayantha was married as has one daughter and one son. His younger son Lelum is also a musician and singer who worked in a musical band. On 6 April 2020, Jayantha Rathnayake died at the age of 52 while receiving treatments at Apeksha Hospital, Maharagama.

In 1960s, he joined with farmer's army. After few years of work, then he joined with Wildlife Department. He worked in the job for only one month. He was married to longtime partner, Mary Margaret Mayadunne. He met Mary during music classes at Heywood academy. They married in September 1970. It was the only day that he shaved his beard completely. She is a retired music teacher. The couple has four children, where one died at very small age. His daughter and two sons are not related to music.

On 17 July 2017, he was admitted to the Colombo National Hospital due to a sudden illness. He died on 18 July 2017 at the age of 69 while receiving treatments. The remains were placed at his residence at No: 78/C, Bopitiya Road, Uswetakeiyawa. The funeral took place on 20 July 2017 at the Hunupitiya Cemetery.

Music career
He went to M.G.P music academy to learn music under Ananda Perera's father. In 1968, he attended to the State Music College, now known as the Institute of Aesthetic Studies. Then he learned Western music under R.A. Chandrasena. At that time, he attended to the music classes conducted by Premasiri Khemadasa. He started to play cello under the guidance of M. K. Rocksamy and then from Miss Joyce at Ceylon Symphony. He became the only cello artist in the preceding years of 60s and 70s in every film.

Rathnayake joined cinema as a backing violin player under Khemadasa for the film Hanthane Kathawa directed by Sugathapala Senarath Yapa in 1969. The country's first cartoon film, Dutugemunu by Givantha Arthasadge was his first film as a musical director. Unfortunately, the film was only screened one day. Subsequently, he composed music for the blockbuster film Handaya. The film won several awards and received positive reviews from critics. His composed the popular song Kawuruda Kawuruda Dan Lokko in that film. 

Rathnayake was the music director for many films directed by Gamini Fonseka such as Uthumaneni, Sagarayak Meda, Koti Waligaya and Nomiyena Minisun. He composed the song Paaradise sung by H.R. Jothipala and Desmond Rodrigo. He made the lyrics for the song Mihipita Bim Agalak sung by W.D. Amaradeva for the film Nomiyena Minisun. 

He was the music director for all the films directed by Dinesh Priyasad including, Demodara Palama and Peralikarayo. Then he continued to work in many blockbuster commercial films of Roy de Silva such as Re Daniel Dawal Migel film series, Jonsun and Gonsun, Cheriyo film series and Sepata Dukata Sunny. He had to compose music for Hindi tunes in certain Sinhala films such as Jaya Mangalam Suba Mangalam song sung by Jothipala for the film Peralikarayo This song was the last film song written by Karunaratne Abeysekera. Jothipala has sung to his music in many films such as Ridee Thella, Waradata Danduwam, Paaradise and Peralikarayo.

He was also awarded the Sarasaviya Award for Best Music Director for the film Ekada Wahi directed by Parakrama Jayasinghe. He also acted in that film. Rathnayake's maiden cinema acting came through the 1992 film Raja Daruwo directed by Daya Wimalaweera. For that film, he composed the popular song Dilidune Daruwane Mage sung by Gratien Ananda. He also composed music for several television serials such as Sannaliyane and acted in the serial Kiri Kandulak.

Apart from that, Rathnayake also composed music for television cartoons. His song Muhuda Mage Goda Bimai in the cartoon "Dosthara Honda Hitha" gained large popularity. He composed the most number of Christian songs as a Buddhist.

Filmography

References

External links
 සංගීත අධ්‍යක්ෂ සෝමපාල රත්නායක මහතා අභාවප්‍රාප්ත වෙයි
 සංගීතවේදී සෝමපාල රත්නායක සමුගනී
 සෝමපාල රත්නායක මහතා අභාවප්‍රාප්ත වෙයි
 වික්ටර්ගේ සොහොයුරු සෝමපාල රත්නායක අභාවප්‍රාප්ත වෙයි
 ප්‍රවීණ සංගීතවේදීයෙකු දිවි ගමනට සමුදෙයි

1947 births
2017 deaths
Sinhalese musicians
Sri Lankan composers